Bian Shoumin (Chinese: 边寿民; 1684–1752; original name Bian Weiqi [Chinese: 边维祺]), courtesy name as Yi-gong (颐公) or Jian-seng (漸僧), sobriquet as Weijian Laoren (苇间老人, or "Old man among Reeds"), is a famed Chinese painter in Qing Dynasty. A native Shanyang (now Huai'an), he was one of the "Eight Eccentrics of Yangzhou" and famous for painting wild geese, which gains a name Bianyan (边雁, or "Bian geese").

See also
Geese in Chinese poetry

References
邊頤公花卉冊 (Bian Yigong Hua Hui Ce). 高弋虬藏, 高野候鉴定 (Gao Yiqiu, Gao Yehou). 上海: 中華書局, 民国24年[1935] (Shanghai: Zhonghua Shu Ju, Minguo 24 nian). OCLC Number: 52510593.
邊頤公花果草蟲冊(邊壽民繪) (Bian Yigong Hua Guo Cao Chong Ce). 上海: 有正書局, 192-? (Shanghai: You Zheng Shu Ju). OCLC Number: 708687964.
清邊壽民蘆雁畫冊 (Qing Bian Shoumin Lu Yan Hua Ce). 台北:漢華文化事業股份有限公司, 民國61 [1972] (Taobei: Han hua wen hua shi ye gu fen you xian gong si, Minguo 61). OCLC Number: 33939849 (OCoLC) 78526603.
邊壽民 (Bian Shoumin). 馬鴻增撰文 (Ma Hongzeng authored). 天津: 天津人民美術出版社, 2000 (Tianjin: Tianjin Renmin Meishu Chubanshe). OCLC Number: 44582447.

External links
Bian Shoumin in the collection of the Metropolitan Museum of Art, New York
Bian Shoumin in the collection of the Cleveland Museum of Art, Cleveland, OH

1684 births
1752 deaths
Qing dynasty painters
Painters from Huai'an